McArthur may refer to:

People
 McArthur (surname)

Geography
 McArthur, Arkansas, an unincorporated town in Desha County
 McArthur, California, in Shasta County
 McArthur, Modoc County, California
 McArthur, Ohio
 McArthur Basin, a large intracratonic sedimentary basin in northern Australia
 McArthur Lake (disambiguation)
 McArthur River, Northern Territory, Australia
 McArthur River uranium mine, Saskatchewan, Canada
 McArthur River zinc mine, Northern Territory, Australia
 McArthur Township, Logan County, Ohio

Ships
 USC&GS McArthur (1874)
 NOAAS McArthur (S 330) (formerly USC&GS McArthur)
 NOAAS McArthur II (R 330)
 , a private maritime security ship in service since 2007

Other uses
 McArthur Court, an arena at the University of Oregon campus in Eugene
 McArthur Glen Designer Outlet Wales, a commercial development consisting of around 90 different stores

See also
 MacArthur (disambiguation)